Lamar County Airport  is a public-use airport in Lamar County, Alabama, United States. It is owned by the Lamar County Commission and located six nautical miles (7 mi, 11 km) north of the central business district of Vernon, Alabama.

Facilities and aircraft 
Lamar County Airport covers an area of 75 acres (30 ha) at an elevation of 463 feet (141 m) above mean sea level. It has one runway designated 17/35 with an asphalt surface measuring 3,613 by 75 feet (1,101 x 23 m).

For the 12-month period ending August 19, 2008, the airport had 1,604 general aviation aircraft operations, an average of 31 per week. At that time there were five aircraft based at this airport, all single-engine.

References

External links 
 Official webpage of Lamar County Airport
 Aerial image as of 18 January 1999 from USGS The National Map
 

Airports in Alabama
Transportation in Lamar County, Alabama
Buildings and structures in Lamar County, Alabama